The Tetrahedron in Bottrop (German: Bottrop Tetraeder or officially Haldenereignis Emscherblick) is a walkable steel structure in the form of a tetrahedron with a side length of 60m, resting on four 9m tall concrete pillars. It is  located in Bottrop, Germany, on top of the mine dump Halde Beckstraße and serves as the town's landmark. It was opened on German Unity Day 3 October 1995.

The design is reminiscent of the Sierpinski tetrix: placing four half-size tetrahedra corner to corner and adding an octahedron in the middle, a full-size tetrahedron is formed; this process can be repeated recursively to form larger and larger tetrahedra.

Buildings and structures in Bottrop
Observation towers in North Rhine-Westphalia
Towers completed in 1995